USS Bainbridge (DDG-96) is an  guided missile destroyer in the United States Navy. She is the fifth ship to carry that name, and the 46th destroyer of a planned 75-ship class. Bainbridge is named in honor of Commodore William Bainbridge, who as commander of the frigate  distinguished himself in the War of 1812 when he and his crew captured , a 38-gun fifth-rate frigate of the Royal Navy.

Since her commissioning in 2005, Bainbridge has been active in the Mediterranean Sea, but most of the attention she has garnered has been as a result of the failed hijacking attempt of the U.S.-flagged freighter  by Somali pirates in April, 2009, which ended with the release of the vessel's master, Captain Richard Phillips, on 12 April 2009. After crewmen of the captured cargo vessel managed to retake the ship, the pirates retreated, taking the ship's master hostage in a lifeboat. Bainbridge, and  shadowed the pirates, and with FBI assistance attempted negotiations for the safe return of the captive captain until U.S. Navy SEAL snipers resolved the situation with deadly force. The story of this incident was turned into the 2013 motion picture titled Captain Phillips, starring Tom Hanks. Bainbridge was portrayed by sister ship .

Construction 
Bainbridge is one of 75 authorized Arleigh Burke-class guided missile destroyers, and is classified as a member of the Flight IIA–class variation that incorporate the 5"/62 caliber gun mount, an improvement over the previous /54 caliber gun mounts on the earlier Arleigh Burke-class destroyers. In addition to her guns, Bainbridge carries over 100 missiles of various types aboard two separate Mk 41 VLS magazines. Her superstructure features the AN/SPY-1 radar indicative of the Aegis combat system, which allows the destroyer to track over 100 targets simultaneously. (Owing to the presence of the Aegis system, Bainbridge and her sisters are sometimes incorrectly referred to as Aegis-class ships.) She is also equipped with the Remote Mine-hunting System (RMS), which includes the Remote Mine-hunting Vehicle (RMV), an unmanned craft that detects, classifies, and localizes underwater mines.

Bainbridge was floated from drydock and christened on 13 November 2004 at Bath Iron Works, Bath, Maine, sponsored by Susan Bainbridge Hay, Commodore William Bainbridge's great-great-great-granddaughter. She was commissioned on 12 November 2005, with Commander John M. Dorey commanding in Port Everglades, Florida.

History 

While on deployment under SNMG-1, they visited various ports across the Mediterranean such as Valletta, Malta; A Coruña, Spain; Istanbul, Turkey; Crete, Athens, Greece; as well as Port Louis, Mauritius; Port Victoria, Seychelles in the Indian Ocean.

On 8 April 2009, Bainbridge was dispatched in response to a hostage situation in which Somali pirates had seized control of an American-flagged container vessel, . The crew of Maersk Alabama were able to get to safety, after their captain had been taken hostage by the pirates. The captain Richard Phillips was taken to and held on a lifeboat, and refused release in an unsuccessful attempt to exchange him for a pirate the ship's crew had captured. The destroyer shadowed and later encircled the Somali pirates during the standoff, at which time the pirates and Bainbridge began negotiating for the safe release of the captain who was held captive. On 12 April 2009, Captain Phillips was freed—reportedly in good condition—during a US Navy SEAL team assault. Three of the Somali pirates were killed by US Navy SEAL sharpshooters aboard Bainbridge, and one was captured.

In January 2014, Bainbridge completed a six-month deployment to Sixth Fleet and returned to her homeport of Norfolk, Virginia.

Upon returning to Norfolk, Virginia, in December 2015 following another deployment with the United States 6th Fleet, an investigation was conducted that resulted in the three senior commanders being removed from duty. In a press release, a spokesperson says the Navy investigated Commander Sean Rongers for allegedly allowing gambling and storing fireworks on the ship, and for "poor program management and a poor command climate." The Navy also fired the ship's former Executive Officer, Commander Brandon Murray, and Command Master Chief Richard Holmes. Commander Martin "Marty" Robertson assumed command on 8 April 2016.

In the 13 June 2019 Gulf of Oman incident, Bainbridge responded to a distress signal from Kokuka Courageous, a Japanese oil tanker which caught fire after an apparent explosion while transiting the Gulf of Oman. According to US Defense officials, Bainbridge picked up all 21 crew members who had been rescued by a tugboat.

Awards
 Navy Unit Commendation – (8–16 Apr 2009) Maersk Alabama hijacking
 Navy Meritorious Unit Commendation – (May–Nov 2015)
 Navy E Ribbon – (2011)
 Arleigh Burke Fleet Trophy – (2012)

References

External links
 
 Official ship's site

 

2004 ships
Destroyers of the United States
Arleigh Burke-class destroyers
Carrier Strike Group Two
Ships built in Bath, Maine